, also known in many European editions as , is a 1983 war film co-written and directed by Nagisa Ōshima, co-written by Paul Mayersberg, and produced by Jeremy Thomas. The film is based on the experiences of Sir Laurens van der Post (portrayed by Tom Conti) as a prisoner of war in Japan during World War II, as depicted in his books The Seed and the Sower (1963) and The Night of the New Moon (1970). It stars David Bowie, Ryuichi Sakamoto, Takeshi Kitano and Jack Thompson; Sakamoto also wrote the score and the vocal theme "Forbidden Colours", which features David Sylvian.

The film was entered into the 1983 Cannes Film Festival in competition for the Palme d'Or. Sakamoto's score won the film a BAFTA Award for Best Film Music.

Plot
In 1942, Captain Yonoi is the commander of a POW camp in Japanese-occupied Java. A strict adherent to the bushido code, his only sources of connection to the prisoners lie in the empathetic Lt. Col. John Lawrence, the only inmate fluent in Japanese, and the abrasive spokesman Gp. Capt. Hicksley, who repeatedly resists Yonoi's attempts to find weapons experts among the prisoners for the Japanese army's interests. Lawrence has befriended Sgt. Gengo Hara, but remains at odds with the rest of the staff. Summoned to the military trial of the recently-captured Major Jack Celliers, Yonoi is fascinated by his resilience and has him interned at the camp. After the trial, Yonoi confides with Lawrence that he is haunted with shame due to his absence during the February 26 Incident, believing he should have died alongside the rebels and implying that his focus on honor stems from this. Sensing a kindred spirit in Celliers, Yonoi's fascination grows into a romantic obsession: he treats him specially, watches him sleep, and repeatedly asks Hara about him in private.

When the inmates are made to fast as punishment for insubordination during the forced seppuku of a guard (Okura), Celliers sneaks in food. The guards catch him and find a smuggled radio during the subsequent investigation, forcing him and Lawrence to take the blame. Yonoi's batman, realizing the hold Celliers has on him, attempts to kill Celliers in his sleep that night, but fails after he wakes up and escapes, freeing Lawrence too. Yonoi catches Celliers and challenges him to a duel in exchange for his freedom, but Celliers refuses; the batman returns and commits suicide for his failure, urging Yonoi to kill Celliers before his feelings overpower him. 

At the funeral, Lawrence learns that he and Celliers will be executed for the radio, despite the lack of evidence, to preserve his sense of  order; enraged, he trashes the funeral altar and is forced back into his cell. That night, Celliers reveals to Lawrence that as a teenager, he betrayed his younger brother, long bullied for his hunchback, by refusing to spare him a humiliating and traumatizing initiation ritual at their boarding school. Confronting his past, he describes the lifelong shame he felt towards his actions, paralleling Yonoi's predicament. During their conversation, the pair are released by a drunken Hara, as a different prisoner confessed to delivering the radio. As they leave, Hara calls out in English, "Merry Christmas, Lawrence!" Although Yonoi is angry at Hara for exceeding his authority, he only mildly reprimands him.

Hicksley, realizing that Yonoi wants to replace him with Celliers as spokesman, confronts him. The two argue over their withholding of information from one another before an enraged Yonoi orders the whole camp to form up outside the barracks, including the sick bay's ailing patients, resulting in one's death. Hicksley, who refused to bring out the patients, is to be punished for his insubordination with an on-the-spot execution. Before he can be killed, however, Celliers breaks rank and kisses Yonoi on each cheek, choosing to save Hicksley's life at the cost of his own. Caught between a desire for vindication and his feelings for Celliers, a distraught Yonoi collapses and is ultimately relieved from duty. His more rigid replacement has Celliers buried in the sand up to his neck and left to die. Before leaving, Yonoi sneaks into his pen and cuts a lock from his hair, moments before his death.

Four years later, Lawrence visits Hara, who is now a prisoner of the Allies. Hara has learned to speak English and reveals he is to be executed the following day for war crimes. Expressing confusion over the harshness of his sentence given how commonplace his actions were among both sides of the war, he and Lawrence both conclude that while the Allies officially won, morally "we are all wrong." The two reminisce on Celliers and Yonoi, the latter of whom was reported to have been killed after the war, before bidding each other goodbye. As he is leaving, Hara calls out, "Merry Christmas, Mr. Lawrence!".

Cast
 David Bowie as Maj. Jack "Strafer" Celliers
 Chris Broun as Jack Celliers (aged 12)
 Tom Conti as Lt. Col. John Lawrence
 Ryuichi Sakamoto as Capt. Yonoi
 Takeshi Kitano as Sgt. Gengo Hara
 Jack Thompson as Gp. Capt. Hicksley
 Johnny Okura as Kanemoto
 Alistair Browning as De Jong
 James Malcolm as Celliers' brother
 Yuya Uchida as Commandant of military prison
 Ryunosuke Kaneda as Colonel Fujimura, President of the Court
 Takashi Naitō as Lt. Iwata
 Yuji Honma as PFC. Yajima
 Tamio Ishikura as Prosecutor
 Rokko Toura as Interpreter
 Kan Mikami as Lt. Ito
 Hideo Murota as New commandant of the camp

Production

David Bowie was cast as Jack Celliers after director Nagisa Ōshima saw him in a production of The Elephant Man on Broadway. He felt that Bowie had "an inner spirit that is indestructible". While shooting the film, Bowie was amazed that Ōshima had a two- to three-acre camp built on the remote Polynesian island of Rarotonga, but most of the camp was never shot on film. He said Ōshima "only shot little bits at the corners. I kind of thought it was a waste, but when I saw the movie, it was just so potent – you could feel the camp there, quite definitely." Bowie noted how Ōshima would give an incredible amount of direction to his Japanese actors ("down to the minutest detail"), but when directing him or fellow Westerner Tom Conti, he would say "Please do whatever it is you people do." Bowie thought his performance in the film was "the most credible performance" he had done in a film up to that point in his career.

The boarding school sequence was shot on location at King's College, a private high school in Auckland, New Zealand. In a shot of two students playing billiards, another boy in the room can be seen wearing a King's blazer. Other scenes were filmed in various locations around Auckland including Auckland Railway Station.

Contrary to usual cinematic practice, Ōshima shot the film without rushes and shipped the film off the island with no safety prints. "It was all going out of the camera and down to the post office and being wrapped up in brown paper and sent off to Japan", Bowie stated. Ōshima's editor in Japan cut the movie into a rough print within four days of Ōshima returning to Japan.

On set, David Bowie made a bond with his on-screen brother, James Malcolm, whom he later called his “New Zealand brother”. For one pivotal scene in the movie, Malcolm had to sing for Bowie. The next year, Bowie invited Malcolm to join him on stage at Western Springs in Auckland for the Serious Moonlight tour, where they released a dove together as a sign of peace.

Soundtrack

Reception
Review aggregator website Rotten Tomatoes gives Merry Christmas, Mr. Lawrence an 84% approval rating and an average rating of 6.40 out of 10 based on 25 reviews.

The New York Times critic Janet Maslin wrote:

On the film's Japanese actors, Maslin wrote that

The Japanese filmmaker Akira Kurosawa and the American director Christopher Nolan named  Merry Christmas, Mr. Lawrence as among their favorite films.

Box office
In Japan, the film earned  in distributor rentals. In the United States, it grossed .

It sold 2,385,100 tickets in the United States, France and Sweden. It also sold 423,778 tickets in Germany, and 54 tickets in Switzerland and Spain since 2007, for a combined  tickets sold in overseas territories outside of Japan and the United Kingdom.

See also
 List of Christmas films

References

External links
 
 
 
 
 Lawrence of Shinjuku: Merry Christmas Mr. Lawrence an essay by Chuck Stephens at the Criterion Collection

1983 drama films
1983 LGBT-related films
Gay-related films
1980s war drama films
1980s Christmas films
Japanese Christmas films
Japanese war drama films
British Christmas films
British war drama films
1980s English-language films
English-language Japanese films
1980s Japanese-language films
World War II prisoner of war films
Pacific War films
HanWay Films films
Recorded Picture Company films
Films directed by Nagisa Ōshima
Japanese LGBT-related films
British LGBT-related films
Films scored by Ryuichi Sakamoto
Films set in Indonesia
Films shot in the Cook Islands
Films shot in New Zealand
Films produced by Jeremy Thomas
Albums produced by Ryuichi Sakamoto
Films with screenplays by Paul Mayersberg
Japan in non-Japanese culture
British World War II films
Japanese World War II films
1980s British films
1980s Japanese films
Films about the British Army